The , literally meaning New Tōmei, is a national expressway in Japan running parallel to the Tomei Expressway as an alternate route. It is operated by Central Nippon Expressway Company. The expressway is also numbered E1A under the "2016 Proposal for Realization of Expressway Numbering".

Shin-Tōmei Expressway provides a more direct and shorter route between Tokyo and Nagoya compared to the Tōmei Expressway and avoids most city centres along the way. Its western terminus connects with Isewangan Expressway in Nagoya.

History
Shin-Tōmei Expressway was partially opened on April 14, 2012 with 162 km section from Gotemba, Shizuoka to Mikkabi, Hamamatsu, Shizuoka.

On February 13, 2016, the 55 km section connecting with the eastern terminus  of Isewangan Expressway in Nagoya to Mikkabi was opened.

On January 28, 2018 the outer circumferential highway of Tokyo, the Ken-Ō Expressway, was linked with the Shin-Tōmei Expressway in Ebina, Kanagawa.

On March 7, 2019 the Shin Tomei Expressway between the Atsugi Minami IC and the Isehara JCT was opened to traffic.

On March 15, 2020 a 3 km section between the Isehara JCT and the Isehara-Oyama IC was opened to traffic 

On April 10, 2021 the section between the Gotemba JCT and the Shin Gotemba IC was opened to traffic

On April 16, 2022 a 13 km section between the Isehara-Oyama IC and the Shin Hadano IC was opened to traffic but the 25 km section between the Shin Gotemba IC and the Shin Hadano IC is still under construction

Future
The section between Shin Gotemba IC and Shin Hadano IC is still under construction and slated to open in 2023
. Once completed, Shin-Tōmei offers direct connection between Osaka, Nagoya and Tokyo through Isewangan Expressway and the Shin-Meishin Expressway. The entire cost for the project from Tokyo to Osaka is 7 trillion yen (around 70 billion dollars).

List of interchanges and features 

 IC - interchange, SIC - smart interchange, JCT - junction, SA - service area, PA - parking area, BS - bus stop, TN - tunnel, TB - toll gate, BR - bridge

Shin-Tōmei Expressway route 
{|class="wikitable"
|-
!style="border-bottom:3px solid green;"|No.
!style="border-bottom:3px solid green;"|Name
!style="border-bottom:3px solid green;"|Connections
!style="border-bottom:3px solid green;"|Dist. fromOrigin
!style="border-bottom:3px solid green;"|Bus Stop
!style="border-bottom:3px solid green;"|Notes
!colspan="2" style="border-bottom:3px solid green;"|Location
|-
|colspan="8" style="text-align: center; background:#dff9f9;"|Through to Daini-Tōkai Expressway (planned)
|-
!style="background-color: #BFB;"|1
|Ebina-minami JCT
| – to Tōmei Expressway, Chūō Expressway, Shin-Shōnan Bypass, Chigasaki, Hachiōji 
|style="text-align: center;"|0.0
|style="text-align: center;"|
|
|Ebina
|rowspan="7" style="width:1em;"|Kanagawa
|-
!style="background-color: #BFB;"|2
|Atsugi-minami IC
| National Route 129
|style="text-align: center;"|1.5
|style="text-align: center;"|
|
|Atsugi
|-
!style="background-color: #BFB;"|5-1
|Isehara JCT
| Tōmei Expressway
|style="text-align: center;"|5.8
|style="text-align: center;"|
|Nagoya-bound only
 |rowspan="2"|Isehara
|-
!style="background-color: #BFB;"|3
|Isehara-Oyama IC 
|Pref. Route 603 (Kamikasuya Atsugi Route) Atsugi-Hadano Road
|style="text-align: center;"|8.2
|
|-
!style="background-color: #BFB;"|3-1
|Hadano-Tanzawa SA/SIC 
|Pref. Route 705 (Horiyamashita Hadano Station Route) Atsugi-Hadano Road (Planned)
|style="text-align: center;"|17.9
|
|Service Area not yet opened
|rowspan="2"|Hadano
|-
!style="background-color: #BFB;"|4
|Shin-Hadano IC 
| National Route 246 Atsugi-Hadano Road (Planned)
|style="text-align: center;"|21.0
|
|
|-
!style="background-color: #BFB;"|-
|style="background-color:#ffdead;"|Yamakita SIC 
|style="background-color:#ffdead;"|Pref. Route 76 (Yamakita Fujino Route)
|style="text-align: center; background-color:#ffdead;"|↓
|style="text-align: center; background-color:#ffdead;"|
|rowspan="2"style="background-color:#ffdead;"|Opening year undecided
|Yamakita
|-
!style="background-color: #BFB;"|-
|style="background-color:#ffdead;"|Oyama PA/SIC 
|style="background-color:#ffdead;"|Pref. Route 151 (Subashiri Oyama Route)
|style="text-align: center; background-color:#ffdead;"|↓
|style="text-align: center; background-color:#ffdead;"|
|Oyama
|rowspan="21" style="width:1em;"|Shizuoka
|-
!style="background-color: #BFB;"|5
|Shin-Gotemba IC 
| National Route 138 ( Gotemba Bypass)Pref. Route 406 (Hitosugi Shibanta Route)
|style="text-align: center;"|46.2
|style="text-align: center;"|
|
|rowspan="2"|Gotemba
|-
!style="background-color: #BFB;"|7-1
|Gotemba JCT
| Tōmei Expressway
|style="text-align: center;"|53.3
|
|Tokyo-bound only
|-
!style="background-color: #BFB;"|6
|Nagaizumi-Numazu IC
|Pref. Route 87 (Ōoka Motonagakubo Route) Izu-Jūkan Expressway
|style="text-align: center;"|66.5
|
|
|Nagaizumi
|-
!style="background-color: #BFB;"|6-1
|Surugawan-Numazu SA/SIC
|Pref. Route 22 (Mishima Fuji Route)
|style="text-align: center;"|72.0
|
|
|Numazu
|-
!style="background-color: #BFB;"|7
|Shin-Fuji IC
| Nishi-Fuji RoadPref. Route 88 (Isshiki Kuzawa Route)
|style="text-align: center;"|86.8
|
|
|Fuji
|-
!style="background-color: #BFB;"|8
|Shin-Shimizu IC
| National Route 52
|style="text-align: center;"|101.2
|
|
|rowspan="3"|Shimizu-ku, Shizuoka
|-
!style="background-color: #BFB;"|PA
|Shimizu PA
|
|style="text-align: center;"|103.2
|
|
|-
!style="background-color: #BFB;"|9
|Shin-Shimizu JCT
| Chūbu-Ōdan Expressway Shimizu Connection Route 
|style="text-align: center;"|110.6
|
|
|-
!style="background-color: #BFB;"|10
|Shin-Shizuoka IC
|Pref. Route 27 (Ikawako Miyuki Route)Pref. Route 74 (Yamawaki Ōya Route)
|style="text-align: center;"|119.8
|
|
|rowspan="2"|Aoi-ku, Shizuoka
|-
!style="background-color: #BFB;"|10-1
|Shizuoka SA/SIC
|Pref. Route 209 (Shizuoka Asahina Fujieda Route)
|style="text-align: center;"|131.0
|
|
|-
!style="background-color: #BFB;"|11
|Fujieda-Okabe IC
| National Route 1Pref. Route 209 (Shizuoka Asahina Fujieda Route)Pref. Route 81 (Yaizu Mori Route)
|style="text-align: center;"|138.4
|
|
|rowspan="2"|Fujieda
|-
!style="background-color: #BFB;"|PA
|Fujieda PA
|
|style="text-align: center;"|141.3
|
|
|-
!style="background-color: #BFB;"|12
|Shimada-Kanaya IC
| National Route 473 Kanaya-Omaezaki Connecting Road (Planned)
|style="text-align: center;"|153.4
|
|
|Shimada
|-
!style="background-color: #BFB;"|PA
|Kakegawa PA
|
|style="text-align: center;"|161.0
|
|
|Kakegawa
|-
!style="background-color: #BFB;"|13
|Mori-Kakegawa IC
|Pref. Route 40 (Kakegawa Tenryū Route)
|style="text-align: center;"|170.3
|
|
|rowspan="2"|Mori
|-
!style="background-color: #BFB;"|13-1
|Enshū-Morimachi PA/SIC
|Pref. Route 40 (Kakegawa Tenryū Route)
|style="text-align: center;"|173.7
|
|
|-
!style="background-color: #BFB;"|13-2
|Shin-Iwata SIC
|
|style="text-align: center;"|178.1
|
|
|Iwata
|-
!style="background-color: #BFB;"|14
|Hamamatsu-Hamakita IC
| National Route 152
|style="text-align: center;"|182.4
|
|
|rowspan="2"|Hamakita-ku, Hamamatsu
|-
!style="background-color: #BFB;"|14-1
|Hamamatsu SA/SIC
|Pref. Route 68 (Hamakita Mikkabi Route)
|style="text-align: center;"|188.5
|
|
|-
!style="background-color: #BFB;"|15
|Hamamatsu-Inasa JCT
|  San-en Nanshin Expressway  Inasa Connection Route 
|style="text-align: center;"|198.0
|
|
|Kita-ku, Hamamatsu
|-
!style="background-color: #BFB;"|16
|Shinshiro IC
| National Route 151
|style="text-align: center;"|210.4
|style="text-align: center;"|
|
|rowspan="2"|Shinshiro
|rowspan="5" style="width:1em;"|Aichi
|-
!style="background-color: #BFB;"|PA
|Nagashino-Shitaragahara PA
|
|style="text-align: center;"|213.3(↓)212.8(↑)
|
|
|-
!style="background-color: #BFB;"|17
|Okazaki-higashi IC
| National Route 473 (Okazaki-Nukata Bypass)
|style="text-align: center;"|236.5
|
|
|rowspan="2"|Okazaki
|-
!style="background-color: #BFB;"|SA
|Okazaki SA
|
|style="text-align: center;"|250.3
|
|
|-
!style="background-color: #BFB;"|1
|Toyota-higashi JCT
| Tōkai-Kanjō Expressway
|style="text-align: center;"|253.2
|style="text-align: center;"|
|
|Toyota
|-
|colspan="8" style="text-align: center;"|Through to  Isewangan Expressway

Shimizu Connection Route 
Located in Shimizu-ku, Shizuoka
{|table class="wikitable"
|-
!style="border-bottom:3px solid green;"|No.
!style="border-bottom:3px solid green;"|Name
!style="border-bottom:3px solid green;"|Connections
!style="border-bottom:3px solid green;"|Dist. fromShimizu JCT
!style="border-bottom:3px solid green;"|Notes
|-
!style="background-color:#BFB;"|9-2
|Shimizu JCT
| Tōmei Expressway
|style="text-align:right;"|0.0
|
|-
!style="background-color:#BFB;"|9-1
|Shimizu-Ihara IC
|Pref. Route 75 (Shimizu Fujinomiya Route)
|style="text-align:right;"|1.8
|
|-
!style="background-color:#BFB;"|9
|Shin-Shimizu JCT
| Shin-Tōmei Expressway Main Route
|style="text-align:right;"|4.5
|
|-
|colspan="8" style="text-align: center;"|Through to  Chūbu-Ōdan Expressway

Inasa Connection Route 
Located in Kita-ku, Hamamatsu
{|table class="wikitable"
|-
!style="border-bottom:3px solid green;"|No.
!style="border-bottom:3px solid green;"|Name
!style="border-bottom:3px solid green;"|Connections
!style="border-bottom:3px solid green;"|Dist. fromMikkabi JCT
!style="border-bottom:3px solid green;"|Notes
|-
|colspan="8" style="text-align: center;"|Through to San-en Ise Connection Route (planned)
|-
!style="background-color:#BFB;"|17-1
|Mikkabi JCT
| Tōmei Expressway
|style="text-align:right;"|0.0
|
|-
!style="background-color:#BFB;"|15-1
|Hamamatsu-Inasa IC
| National Route 257
|style="text-align:right;"|11.0
|
|-
!style="background-color:#BFB;"|15
|Hamamatsu-Inasa JCT
| Shin-Tōmei Expressway Main Route
|style="text-align:right;"|12.7
|
|-
|colspan="8" style="text-align: center;"|Through to   San-en Nanshin Expressway

References

External links

Central Nippon Expressway Company

Expressways in Japan
Roads in Aichi Prefecture
Roads in Shizuoka Prefecture
Roads in Yamanashi Prefecture